Kpasam (Kpasham; Nyesam) is an Adamawa language of Demsa LGA, Adamawa State, Nigeria.

The speakers refer to their language as Nyesam [ɲé sàm], their ethnic group as Isam [ísàm], and their territory as Asam [ásàm]. The Nyesam language is spoken in the villages of Kpasham, Dakli, and Dem.

Further reading
Blench, Roger. 2009. The Maya (Yendang) languages.
Villa, Eveling. 2019. Selected Nyesam documentation (with audio and video). Pangloss Collection: An archive for endangered languages.
Yoder, Zachariah. 2009. Maya wordlists Kpasham (Adamawa), MPEG/X-WAV. PARADISEC.

References

Languages of Nigeria
Mumuye–Yendang languages